Evandi Aavida Vachindi is 1993 Indian Telugu-language drama film directed by E. V. V. Satyanarayana starring Sobhan Babu, Vanisri, Sharada, Harish, Rambha.

The film narrates the story of a struggling husband is who married two wives. Sobhan Babu played the key role as a struggling husband while Sharada and Vanisri played the roles of his wives.

Cast
 Sobhan Babu as Ramakrishnayya
 Vanisri as Sathyavati
 Sharada as Janaki
 Harish as Achchi Babu
 Rambha as Jhansi
 Kaikala Satyanarayana
 Kota Srinivasa Rao
 Brahmanandam as Avadhani
 Sivaji Raja
 Ironleg Sastri
 Babu Mohan

Soundtrack 

The soundtrack was composed by Raj–Koti and all lyrics were written by Bhuvana Chandra.

References

External links
 
 Evandi Aavida Vachindi film on Youtube

Films directed by E. V. V. Satyanarayana
Films scored by Raj–Koti
1990s Telugu-language films